P Henderson & Company, also known as Paddy Henderson, was a ship owning and management company based in Glasgow, Scotland and operating to Burma. Patrick Henderson started business in Glasgow as a merchant at the age of 25 in 1834. He had three brothers. Two were merchants working for an agent in the Italian port of Leghorn; the third, George, was a sea captain with his own ship.

The brothers together invested in their first ship, the Peter Senn, and the business grew from there. Patrick died in 1841, and the business was taken over by his brother, Captain George Henderson. In 1848, George took into partnership a young man of outstanding ability, James Galbraith, who expanded the business from merchants, to ship owners and ship managers.

The Company started trading to New Zealand in 1854 with sailing ships carrying Scottish emigrants, and the Royal Mail.

Albion Shipping Company
In 1860, there being little cargo from New Zealand to Scotland, P Henderson & Co started to call at Burma with a regular service. This trade grew so quickly that in order to raise further capital, several new partners came in to form the Albion Shipping Company Ltd as ship owners. The vessels were managed by P. Henderson & Co.

The Albion Shipping Company became the dominant British company in the New Zealand trade, and holders of the mail contract.

In 1869 the Suez Canal was opened, making steamships more economic on the Glasgow – Burma route, so in 1870 P. Henderson & Co. started a steamship service between Glasgow, Liverpool and Burma. No mail contract was available on this route as all mail went via India.

In 1874 the British and Burmese Steam Navigation Company Ltd (BBSN) was formed to increase the capital and spread the risk of the Burmese side of the business as it grew from the era of sailing ships into more expensive and much larger steamships. BBSN took over the fleet of steamships on the Burma route, and appointed P Henderson and Co as managing agents. Most of the shares in the new company were taken up by P Henderson partners and their associates. Ships' Masters were encouraged to take shares. Peter Denny took about a fifth of the capital.

1882 saw P. Henderson and Co. pioneer the first frozen meat shipment from New Zealand to London. It used refrigerated sailing ships, because as yet there were no coaling stations en route, and without them a steamship would have to have such large coal bunkers that they would take up too much valuable cargo space.

Shaw, Savill & Albion Line

Nevertheless, steam propulsion increased trading possibilities and capital requirements that were beyond the capabilities of P. Henderson or the Albion Shipping Company to fulfil on their own, and so in 1882, the Albion Shipping Company amalgamated with Shaw Savill and Company to form the Shaw, Savill and Albion Company Ltd. After the amalgamation, P. Henderson & Co remained as managers and loading brokers for the new company in Glasgow. British and Burmese Steam Navigation Company Ltd remained as a shipowning company along with another member of the group, the Burmah Steam Ship Company Ltd.

James Galbraith, the driving force of P. Henderson & Co, died in 1884. His death marked the end of an era of private capital, of pioneering and of expansion into unknown countries and technologies.

P Henderson ships lost

Henderson's quickly replaced the ship with a new  built the following year, but the new ship's career was cut short in the First World War, when she disappeared in January 1917 with the loss of all 92 persons aboard. There is no Imperial German Navy record of her sinking, but she is presumed to have been sunk off the south coast of Ireland.

That year P Henderson lost one more ship to enemy action. Fortunately all but one of those aboard survived. Just after the Armistice with Germany P Henderson lost another ship: on 19 December 1918 the passenger and cargo ship  was destroyed by fire in Rangoon. In the 1920s and '30s P Henderson had a number of new ships built, including a new  in 1921.

P Henderson suffered greater losses in the Second World War. On 24 November 1939 the Pegu ran around in the area of the Crosby Channel off Liverpool. She broke her back and was wrecked in separate bow and stern sections. On 13 July 1940 the German auxiliary cruiser Atlantis sank the passenger and cargo liner Kemmendine in the middle of the Indian Ocean by shellfire.

On 9 April 1942 the passenger ship  was in Trincomalee in Ceylon when aircraft from a Japanese aircraft carrier attacked her and set her afire. Her crew abandoned ship and then she was sunk by shellfire. The Sagaing was raised by the Sri Lankan Eastern Naval Command unit in March 2018. Kalewa sank but Boringia survived the collision and rescued everyone aboard.

P Henderson's heaviest losses were in 1943. On 2 April the  sank the cargo ship  by torpedo off the coast of Portugal, killing six of her crew. On 9 May  sank the cargo and passenger ship  by torpedo off the coast of West Africa, killing all 66 people aboard. On 17 June  sank the passenger ship  in the Mediterranean. Yoma had been converted into a troopship, and the sinking killed 484 people. On 24 July  sank the cargo ship  by torpedo off the coast of Brazil, killing two members of the crew.

Elder, Dempster Lines
Elder, Dempster Lines chartered P Henderson's fleet from 1947 and took over the company in 1952. Under Elder, Dempster modernisation of the P Henderson fleet continued, with new motor ships being delivered until at least 1961.

In 1965 Ocean Steamship Co acquired control of the Elder, Dempster group. In 1967 after the Six-Day War Egypt closed the Suez Canal, so Ocean SS Co discontinued the Burma route and transferred Henderson's last three ships to Elder, Dempster. By 1970 all stock had been transferred to Elder, Dempster and the Henderson name vanished from the shipping trade.

See also
 Irrawaddy Flotilla Company
 SR Merchant Navy Class 35009 Shaw Savill – steam locomotive named after the shipping company

References

External links

P. Henderson & Co House Flag
National Archives Listing

Companies based in Glasgow
Defunct companies of Scotland
Scotland and the British Empire
Shipping companies of Scotland